The Longford Lectures are held annually in November in the circular Assembly Hall of Church House, Westminster. They aim to provide a national platform for a serious contribution to questions of social and penal reform.

The Lectures are organised by The Longford Trust which celebrates the achievements and continues the work of Lord Longford. It was established in 2002 by friends and admirers to further the goals he pursued, particularly in the field of social and prison reform.

The Longford Lectures were sponsored originally by The Independent and more recently by the Daily Telegraph.

In addition to the Lectures, the Trust awards The Longford Prize to individuals and organisations who play a prominent role in the field of prison reform.

The broadcaster and journalist Jon Snow chairs the event.

Past Lectures 

Full transcripts of all lectures and films of recent lectures available on the Longford Trust website.

See also
The Longford Prize
Lord Longford
The Longford Trust

References

British lecture series
Prison reform